Sunflowers (original title, in French: Tournesols) is the title of two series of still life paintings by the Dutch painter Vincent van Gogh. The first series, executed in Paris in 1887, depicts the flowers lying on the ground, while the second set, made a year later in Arles, shows a bouquet of sunflowers in a vase. In the artist's mind, both sets were linked by the name of his friend Paul Gauguin, who acquired two of the Paris versions. About eight months later, Van Gogh hoped to welcome and impress Gauguin again with Sunflowers, now part of the painted Décoration for the Yellow House that he prepared for the guestroom of his home in Arles, where Gauguin was supposed to stay. After Gauguin's departure, Van Gogh imagined the two major versions as wings of the Berceuse Triptych, and finally, he included them in his Les XX in Bruxelles exhibit.

The Paris Sunflowers 

Little is known of Van Gogh's activities during the two years he lived with his brother, Theo, in Paris, 1886–1888. The fact that he had painted Sunflowers already is only revealed in the spring of 1889, when Gauguin claimed one of the Arles versions in exchange for studies he had left behind after leaving Arles for Paris. Van Gogh was upset and replied that Gauguin had absolutely no right to make this request: "I am definitely keeping my sunflowers in question. He has two of them already, let that hold him. And if he is not satisfied with the exchange he has made with me, he can take back his little Martinique canvas, and his self-portrait sent to me from Brittany, at the same time giving me back both my portrait and the two sunflower canvases which he has taken to Paris. So if he ever broaches this subject again, I've told you just how matters stand."

The two Sunflowers in question show two buttons each; one of them was preceded by a small study, and a fourth large canvas combines both compositions.

These were Van Gogh's first paintings with "nothing but sunflowers"—yet, he had already included sunflowers in still life and landscape earlier.

The Arles Sunflowers 
In a letter to Theo dating from 21 or 22 August 1888, Van Gogh wrote: "I'm painting with the gusto of a Marseillais eating bouillabaisse, which won’t surprise you when it's a question of painting large sunflowers." At the time, he was working on three paintings simultaneously and intended to do more, as he explained to his brother: "in the hope of living in a studio of our own with Gauguin, I'd like to do a decoration for the studio. Nothing but large sunflowers".

Leaving aside the first two versions, all Arlesian Sunflowers are painted on size 30 canvases.

The initial versions, August 1888 
The versions of the paintings provided by Van Gogh in his announcement of his sunflower series do not precisely match every detail supplied by him. The first version differs in size, is painted on a size 20 canvas—not on a size 15 canvas as indicated—and all the others differ in the number of flowers depicted from Van Gogh's announcement. The second was evidently enlarged and the initial composition altered by insertion of the two flowers lying in the foreground, center and right. Neither the third nor the fourth shows the dozen or 14 flowers indicated by the artist, but more—fifteen or sixteen.
These alterations are executed wet-in-wet and therefore considered genuine rework—even the more so as they are copied to the repetitions of January 1889; there is no longer a trace of later alterations, at least in this aspect.

The fourth version of the painting was attacked on October 14, 2022 by environmental activists from the Just Stop Oil campaign, who threw tomato soup at it, while it was on display at National Gallery in London, before gluing their hands to the wall. The painting was covered with plexiglass, and it was unharmed with the exception of minor damage to the frame. The two activists were arrested and the painting was put back on display later that day.

The Repetitions, January 1889 

Both repetitions of the 4th version are no longer in their original state. In the Amsterdam version, a strip of wood was added at the top—probably by Van Gogh himself. The Tokyo version, however, was enlarged on all sides with strips of canvas, which were added at a later time—presumably by the first owner, Émile Schuffenecker. The series is perhaps Van Gogh's best known and most widely reproduced. In the 2000s, debate arose regarding the authenticity of one of the paintings, and it has been suggested that this version may have been the work of Émile Schuffenecker or of Paul Gauguin. Most experts, however, conclude that the work is genuine.

The Berceuse-Triptych 

In January 1889, when Vincent had just finished the first repetitions of the Berceuse and the Sunflowers pendants, he told Theo: "I picture to myself these same canvases between those of the sunflowers, which would thus form torches or candelabra beside them, the same size, and so the whole would be composed of seven or nine canvases."

A definite hint for the arrangement of the triptych is supplied by Van Gogh's sketch in a letter of July 1889.

Later that year, Vincent selected both versions for his display at Les XX, 1890.

Sunflowers, friendship and gratitude 

Van Gogh began painting in late summer of 1888 and continued into the following year. One went to decorate his friend Paul Gauguin's bedroom. The paintings show sunflowers in all stages of life, from full bloom to withering. The paintings were considered innovative for their use of the yellow spectrum, partly because newly invented pigments made new colors possible.

In a letter to Theo, Vincent wrote: "It's a type of painting that changes its aspect a little, which grows in richness the more you look at it. Besides, you know that Gauguin likes them extraordinarily. He said to me about them, among other things:
‘that — ... that's... the flower’. You know that Jeannin has the peony, Quost has the hollyhock, but I have the sunflower, in a way."

Subsequent history 

On March 30, 1987, Japanese insurance magnate Yasuo Goto paid the equivalent of US$39,921,750 for Van Gogh's Still Life: Vase with Fifteen Sunflowers at auction at Christie's London, at the time a record-setting amount for a work of art. The price was over three times the previous record of about $12million paid for Andrea Mantegna's Adoration of the Magi in 1985. The record was broken a few months later with the purchase of another Van Gogh, Irises, by Alan Bond for $53.9million at Sotheby's, New York on November 11, 1987.

While it is uncertain whether Yasuo Goto bought the painting himself or on behalf of his company, the Yasuda Fire and Marine Insurance Company of Japan, the painting currently resides at Seiji Togo Yasuda Memorial Museum of Modern Art in Tokyo. After the purchase, a controversy arose whether this is a genuine Van Gogh or an Émile Schuffenecker forgery.

Provenances 
Two Paris versions Van Gogh exchanged with Gauguin in December 1887 or January 1888, were both sold to Ambroise Vollard: one in January 1895 and the other in April 1896.  The first canvas resided for a short time with Félix Roux, but was reacquired by Vollard and sold to Degas, then from his estate to Rosenberg, then to Hahnloser and bequested to the Kunstmuseum Bern. The second was acquired by the Dutch collector Hoogendijk at the sale of his collection by Kann, who ceded the painting to Richard Bühler and then via Thannhauser to the Metropolitan Museum in New York.

Two of Van Gogh's Sunflowers paintings never left the artist's estate: the study for one of the Paris versions (F377) and the repetition of fourth version (F458). Both are in the possession of the Vincent van Gogh Foundation, established 1962 by Vincent Willem van Gogh, the artist's nephew, and on permanent loan to the Van Gogh Museum, Amsterdam.

Five other versions are recorded in the Van Gogh estate papers:
the final Paris version (F.452) in the artist's estate was sold 1909 via C. M. van Gogh, The Hague (J. H. de Bois) to Kröller-Müller
(F457) sold 1894 to Émile Schuffenecker. (Tokyo version).
(F456) sold 1905 via Paul Cassirer to Hugo von Tschudi. (Munich version).
(F459) sold 1908 C. M. van Gogh (J. H. de Bois), The Hague to Fritz Meyer-Fierz, Zürich (destroyed by U.S. air raid in Japan on 6 August 1945).
(F454) sold 1924 via Ernest Brown & Phillips (The Leicester Galleries) to the Tate Gallery; since on permanent loan to the National Gallery, London. (London version).

Two Arles versions left the artist's estate unrecorded:
(F453) (private collection). Sold 1891 to Octave Mirbeau, Paris, (via Tanguy, Paris) for £12 (about £1,300 in 2013 £). Sold 1996 to a private collector for an undisclosed sum.
(F455) (Philadelphia version).

References

Sources 
Bailey, Martin: The Sunflowers Are Mine: The Story of Van Gogh's Masterpiece, Frances Lincoln Limited (2013), 
Dorn, Roland: "Décoration": Vincent van Gogh's Werkreihe für das Gelbe Haus in Arles, Georg Olms Verlag, Hildesheim, Zürich & New York, 1990, pp. 58–61, 73–80, 113–117, 335–348, 455–462 
Hoffmann, Konrad: Zu van Goghs Sonnenblumenbildern, Zeitschrift für Kunstgeschichte 31, 1968, pp. 27–58
 
Stolwijk, Chris, & Veenenbos, Han: The account book of Theo van Gogh and Jo van Gogh-Bonger, Van Gogh Museum, Amsterdam & Primavera Press, Leiden 2002  
Tellegen, Annet: Vincent en Gauguin: schilderijenruil in Paris, Museumjournaal 11, 1966, pp. 42–45
Van Tilborgh, Louis & Hendriks, Ella: The Tokyo 'Sunflowers': a genuine repetition by Van Gogh or a Schuffenecker forgery?, Van Gogh Museum Journal 2001, pp. 17–43
Welsh-Ovcharov, Bogomila: The Ownership of Vincent van Gogh's 'Sunflowers''', The Burlington Magazine'', March 1998, pp. 184–192

External links 

Sunflowers on Google Art Project
Sunflowers at vggallery.com, the complete series of paintings.
Sunflowers, vangoghgallery.com, offers an analysis of two sunflower paintings.
 The Munich version of Vincent van Gogh's Sunflowers at Neue Pinakothek on bavarikon
Van Gogh, paintings and drawings: a special loan exhibition, a fully digitized exhibition catalog from The Metropolitan Museum of Art Libraries, which contains material on these paintings (see index)
Sunflowers (Van Gogh) - Video - Check123 Video Encyclopedia

1887 paintings
1888 paintings
1889 paintings
Collections of the National Gallery, London
Paintings by Vincent van Gogh
Series of paintings by Vincent van Gogh
Still life paintings by Vincent van Gogh
Collections of the Van Gogh Museum
Paintings of Arles by Vincent van Gogh
Flower paintings
Paintings in the collection of the Philadelphia Museum of Art
Collection of the Neue Pinakothek
Vandalized works of art in the United Kingdom